A cavatina is a musical form

Cavatina may also refer to:

Music

Compositions 
Cavatina, composition by Alexandre Tansman
Cavatina, composition by Fritz Kreisler
Cavatina, composition by John Ireland
Cavatina, composition by Cyril Scott
Cavatina, composition by Kurt Weill
Cavatina (Myers), composition by Stanley Myers, played by John Williams in The Deer Hunter movie
Cavatina "Largo al Factotum Della Città", Renato Capecchi From Act 1 of Rossini's The Barber of Seville 
Cavatina, from Donizetti's Don Pasquale, recorded as single by Agostino Lazzari 1959
Cavatina "Casta Diva", released as single by Maria Callas  
Cavatina from Donizetti's Emilia di Liverpool, released as single by Joan Sutherland	1965

Albums
Cavatina, album by Göran Söllscher

Songs
"He Was Beautiful" (Iris Williams song) (Cavatina), sung by Iris Williams 1979
"He's So Beautiful" (Cleo Laine song), English lyric version of "Cavatina", sung by Cleo Laine and John Williams 1976
"En Sång Om Gemenskap", Swedish lyric version of Cavatina, sung by Carola Häggkvist with Timo Korhonen guitar 1984